Javier Ezequiel Iturrioz (born 9 September 1990 in Vicuña Mackenna) is an Argentine motorcycle racer. He has competed in the Moto2 World Championship and the Supersport World Championship.

Career statistics

Grand Prix motorcycle racing

By season

Races by year
(key)

Supersport World Championship

Races by year
(key)

External links

1990 births
Living people
Argentine motorcycle racers
Moto2 World Championship riders
Supersport World Championship riders